"Chariot d'étoiles" is the second single by Belgian singer Melody. She released it in 1990.

The song debuted at number 42 in France during the week of 10 March 1990, climbing all the way to number 15 for one week in May.

The song would later appear on Melody's debut album, Danse ta vie, which would be out in 1991.

Track listing

Charts

References

External links 
 

1990 songs
1990 singles
Melody (Belgian singer) songs
Carrere Records singles